Jeff Hewitt is the name of:
Jeff Hewitt (politician), American politician from California
Jeff Hewitt (American football), American football player